Bundaberg railway station is located on the North Coast line in Queensland, Australia. It serves the city of Bundaberg.

History
Bundaberg's first railway station, on the Mount Perry railway line, was built in 1881 as a transfer station to the Bundaberg docks for shipping coal from nearby mines. It is now in use as a museum. The station has one side platform and a south facing bay platform. A yard exists opposite the station.

Services
Bundaberg is served by long-distance Traveltrain services; the Spirit of Queensland, Spirit of the Outback and Rockhamption Tilt Train.

It is also the terminal point for a Tilt Train service. It was previously served by the Bundaberg Mail.

References

External links

Bundaberg station Queensland's Railways on the Internet

Buildings and structures in Bundaberg
Regional railway stations in Queensland
North Coast railway line, Queensland